Abigail Lydia Mott Moore (August 6, 1795 – September 4, 1846) was an American Quaker, abolitionist and women's rights activist.

Early life and education
Abigail Mott was born in Cow Bay, Long Island, NY. She was the fifth of seven children by Adam and Ann Mott. She attended the Nine Partners Boarding School in what is now Millbrook, Dutchess County, New York, which was started by her grandfather James Mott and run by the Society of Friends. Abigail's brothers James Mott and Richard Mott also attended the Nine Partners Boarding School. Abigail followed in the footsteps of her brothers and sisters in 1811 and became an assistant teacher at the Nine Partners Boarding School.

Marriage and family
While teaching at the Boarding School, Abigail met and fell in love with fellow teacher, Lindley Murray Moore. The pair moved to Rahway, NJ to start up their own Quaker school and married in 1813. By November 1815, the couple relocated to New York and had their first child Edward Mott Moore. Abigail gave birth to eight children, however only five of her children lived past the age of three. Money troubles led Abigail and her family to relocate to Rochester. They built a two story house and began a new life as farmers.

Activist life
Abigail and her husband were both teachers at the Nine Partners Boarding School and they continued to teach after they left the school. In 1815, while in New York Abigail and her husband took charge of a school run by the Friends Monthly Meeting. By 1820, salary cuts forced Abigail and Lindley to move on and open a boarding school for boys first in Flushing, and then in Westchester Village, NY. By 1831, they chose to retire as teachers and start a new life as farmers. The extra time led the couple to get more involved in the anti-slavery movement. In 1836, Abigail participated in the Farmington Quarterly Meeting, along with Abigail's sister -in-law Lucretia Mott. The group had a strong abolitionist perspective and during that particular meeting Abigail was the signing clerk of the women’s meeting After an orphaned toddler was found wandering around Rochester, Abigail joined up with other women of Rochester and created the Rochester Orphan's Asylum in 1837. Abigail and Lindley, along with other abolitionist, founded one of Rochester’s first anti-slavery societies, the Rochester Anti-Slavery Society, in 1838.

Death
On September 4, 1846 Abigail Mott died from tuberculosis, after being sick for several months. She was 51 years of age. It was noted that Abigail was full of life and enjoyed her family thoroughly.

Notable works
Abigail Mott has written some great works of literature during her life. One of her more famous novels is “Biographical Sketches and Interesting Anecdotes of Persons of Colour”, which was printed and sold by Mahlon Day in 1826. This novel was broken up into sections that deal with different individuals that Abigail Mott has heard tales from during her lifetime. The stories were either told in the first person, from the individual’s point of view, or through third person. The main objective of this novel was to shed light on the evils and dishonesty of slavery during this time period. The tales that are told are extremely personal and highlight the effects that slavery can have on the different classes of society. The accounts not only include African Americans during this time period of slavery but also individuals that are Native American as well. Another novel that has the same theme as “Biographical Sketches and Interesting Anecdotes of Persons of Colour” would be her novel “Narratives of Coloured Americans”. “Narratives of Coloured Americans” was written in the year 1875 and published by William Wood and Company. This novel compiled of various stories that were mostly told in the first person by individuals of color.  Both of her novels achieved the goal of highlighting the numerous negative effects that occur when society allows slavery to continue and no one stands up to make a difference.

Other works written by Abigail are Observations on the Importance of Female Education, The mother and her children : or, Twilight conversation , Biographical Sketches and Interesting Anecdotes of Persons of Color, To Which Is Added, a Selection of Pieces in Poetry, and Remarks on the Present Mode of Educating Females: Being a Copious Abridgement of Miss Hannah More's Strictures on Female Education.

References

External links
 

1775 births
1846 deaths
American Quakers
American abolitionists
American women's rights activists
Activists from New York (state)
Quaker abolitionists